Bärwalde may refer to the following places:

Poland
 Mieszkowice
 Barwice

Germany
 Bärwalde, part of Niederer Fläming
 Bärwalde, part of Radeburg
 Bärwalde, part of Boxberg, Saxony